Mister Bolivia is an annual Bolivian male beauty pageant  held since 1996 and responsible for selecting the country's representatives to the Mister International and Mister World pageants.

History
The contest was founded in 1996 and Gloria Suárez de Limpias has been the event's director since 1996. In the same organization, Gloria organizes Miss Bolivia national competition which the winner traditionally represents Bolivia to the Miss Universe pageant.

International winners
On December 19, 2009 Bruno Kettels was crowned as Mister International 2009 at Plaza International Hotel, Taichung, Taiwan on December 19, 2009. He was overcame the 28 Contestants at the pageant to get the title of Mister International. He is the first Bolivian to get title of Mister International in the history of the pageant.

In 2010 Jorge Langenbacher of Bolivia was declared the winner of Mr. Tourism International 2010 held last Saturday November 27 at Carpa Banca- American Fest de Isla Perico in Panama City, Panama

Official Divisions
Beni
Chuquisaca
Cochabamba
La Paz
Oruro
Pando
Potosí
Santa Cruz
Tarija

Titleholders
In 2006 and 2011 there is no Mister Bolivia pageant. In 2012 Mister Bolivia was selected by appointment.

List of Mister Bolivia at International pageants
Color key

See also
 Miss Bolivia

References

External links
Mister Bolivia official site

Beauty pageants in Bolivia
Recurring events established in 1996
Bolivian awards